Moozhikkal Pankajakshi is an expert in Nokkuvidya Pavakkali a form of puppetry. She was awarded India's fourth highest civilian award the Padma Shri in 2020.

References

Living people
Year of birth missing (living people)
Recipients of the Padma Shri